Anna Hall (born 21 April 1979) is a retired Swedish footballer. Hall was part of the Djurgården Swedish champions' team of 2004.

Honours

Club 
 Djurgården/Älvsjö 
 Damallsvenskan: 2004

References

1979 births
Living people
Swedish women's footballers
Djurgårdens IF Fotboll (women) players
Women's association footballers not categorized by position